Vier Tondichtungen nach A. Böcklin (Four tone poems after Arnold Böcklin), Op. 128, is a composition in four parts for orchestra by Max Reger, based on four paintings by Arnold Böcklin, including Die Toteninsel (Isle of the Dead). He composed them in Meiningen in 1913.

Background and history 
While tone poems were a common genre around 1900, including many works by Richard Strauss, Reger typically wrote more abstract music. He described his Eine romantische Suite, Op. 125, and the tone poems after Böcklin as "Ausflug in das Gebiet der Programmusik" (Excursion in the realm of program music).

Reger composed the four tone poems in Meiningen from end of May to July 1913, after planning it from October 1912. He dedicated the work to Julius Buths. The score and parts were published by Bote & Bock in September 1913. Reger conducted the first performance in Essen on 12 October that year, with the Städtisches Orchester (municipal orchestra).

Structure and scoring 
The four parts are in contrasting tempo, slow–fast–slow–fast. Both slow movements, 1 and 3, are marked Molto sostenuto (aber nie schleppend) (but never dragging), both fast movements Vivace.

The work is scored for a symphonic orchestra of three flutes (including (piccolo), two oboes (including Cor Anglais), two clarinets, two bassoons, contrabassoon, four horns, three trumpets, three trombones, tuba, harp, three timpani and more percussion, solo-violin, strings (divisi in I). The pieces can be played individually or as "a quasi-symphony".

Der geigende Eremit 

 (The Hermit Fiddler, literally: The hermit playing violin) is based on a painting Der Einsiedler (The Hermit) that Böcklin made in Florence in 1884. A solo violin is contrasted by a group of strings playing con sordino and another group playing not muted. The "ethereal violin" has been compared to Ralph Vaughan Williams' The Lark Ascending, composed in 1914.

Klaus Uwe Ludwig wrote an arrangement of the movement for viola and organ, which was published by Breitkopf.

Im Spiel der Wellen 

 (literally: In the play of the waves) is based on a painting Im Spiel der Wellen (Playing in the Waves) that Böcklin made in 1883. Like the painting, the music evokes the shimmering foam of surf in sunlight, and the play of naiads and Triton. A reviewer compares the movement to Debussy's La mer written a few years earlier, noting that "Reger pursued the flamboyant realm of mythical creatures". Both works have a similar "sparkling orchestral character".

Die Toteninsel 

 is based on a painting Bacchantenfest (Feast of the Bacchants), painted around 1856. It may recall the "folly of earlier orgiastic times", or the longing of an older person to still be part of them. Reger, who called his own experience "Sturm und Trank" (storm and drink), as pun on "Sturm und Drang", used conterpoint, harmonic development and refined instrumentation to achieve a dazzling painting in sound.

Later performance 
The work was performed in the official opening concert of the Reger-Jahr (Reger year) 2016 in Leipzig, where Reger died in 1916, played by the orchestra of the Musikhochschule Leipzig.

References

Bibliography

External links 
 
 Max Reger / 4 Tondichtungen nach Böcklin UE
 Maureen Buja: Music and Art: Arnold Böcklin interlude.hk
  Max Reger Festjahr Thüringen 2016 ist das Max Reger Festjahr MDR
 Max Reger: Vier Tondichtungen nach Arnold Böcklin, op. 128 (in German) Schleswig-Holsteinisches Landestheater
 Offizielles Eröffnungskonzert des Reger-Jahres der Stadt Leipzig reger-in-leipzig.de

Symphonic poems
Compositions by Max Reger
1913 compositions
Music based on art